Ceratophyllus breviprojectus is a species of flea in the family Ceratophyllidae. It was described by Liu, Wu and Wu in 1966.

References 

Ceratophyllidae
Insects described in 1966